Nancun Wanbo station, formerly named as Hezhuang station, is a station of Line 7 and Line 18 on the Guangzhou Metro. The station is situated under Hanxi Avenue East, located in Panyu District, Guangzhou. Line 7 began operations on 28 December 2016 and Line 18 began operations on 28 September 2021.

Station layout

Exits

Neighboring building  
 Wanbo Center
 Wanda Plaza

References

External links

Railway stations in China opened in 2016
Guangzhou Metro stations in Panyu District